Sidley may refer to:
 Sidley, East Sussex, England
Sidley railway station
Sidley United F.C. football club 
 Sidley Austin, American legal firm
 Mount Sidley, a volcano in Antarctica
 Sidley Wood, a Site of Special Scientific Interest in Hampshire, U.K.

See also
 Sedley Baronets